Live '05 is a live album by Meat Beat Manifesto initially sold during their live tour in 2006. Left over copies were sold online via the band's official website. The concert recorded took place at Cabaret Metro in Chicago on June 22, 2005. This is a limited edition of 1,000 and each disc is packaged in a digipak signed and customized by Jack Dangers. On the reverse side, near the center of the disc, the text "NEAT BEAT MANIFESTO-LIVE '05" is printed.

Credits
 Video Sampler, Vocals, Synthi Aks, Bass Flute: Jack Dangers
 Video Sampler, DVJ: Ben Stokes
 Sampler, Serge Modular: Mark Pistel
 Drums: Lynn Farmer

Track listing
"I Am Electro" - 6:25
"Spinning Round" - 5:31
"Hello Teenage Amerika" - 5:52
"Radio Babylon" - 8:20
"God O.D." - 5:45
"No Purpose No Design" - 5:27
"It's The Music" - 5:57
"Nuclear Bomb" - 6:12
"Helter Skelter" - 8:18
"Edge Of No Control" - 5:18
"Prime Audio Soup" - 7:02
"Do It With Soul" - 4:46

References 

Meat Beat Manifesto albums